Pitcairnia juncoides is a species of flowering plant in the family Bromeliaceae, native to Colombia and Venezuela). It was first described by Lyman Bradford Smith in 1946.

References

juncoides
Flora of Colombia
Flora of Venezuela
Plants described in 1946